The Parco archeominerario di San Silvestro (Archaeological Mines Park of San Silvestro) is a park in Campiglia Marittima, Tuscany, Italy. It was created following the excavation of the castle of Rocca San Silvestro, a protected natural area of local interest of the Tuscany region established in 1995. It is part of the Val di Cornia parks.

The park's features include:

Miner's Museum
Museum of Archaeology and Minerals
Museum of Mining Machinery 
Temperino Mine
Gallery Lanzi-Temperino
Rocca di San Silvestro

References 
Official website

Protected areas of Italy
Parks in Tuscany
Museums in Tuscany
Archaeological museums in Italy
Mining museums